Paige Barr (born 31 May 2001) is an Australian representative sweep-oar rower. She has represented Australia at senior World Championships and won medals at World Rowing Cups and U23 World Championships.

Club and state rowing
Barr was raised in Bairnsdale, Victoria and attended Gippsland Grammar School where she took up rowing. Her senior club rowing has been from the Mercantile Rowing Club in Melbourne. 

Barr first made state selection for Victoria in the 2022 women's eight which contested and came 1st in the Queen's Cup at the Interstate Regatta within the Australian Rowing Championships. 

Racing in Mercantile colours she won the Australian championship title in the U21 coxless four at the 2021 Australian Rowing Championships and in 2022 won silver in the national women's U23 single scull title.

International representative rowing
In March 2022 Barr was selected in the Australian training squad to prepare for the 2022 international season and the 2022 World Rowing Championships.  She rowed in the three seat of the Australian women's eight at World Rowing Cups II and III taking bronze in Poznan and winning gold in Lucerne.   She was then selected in Australia’s U23 coxless four to row at the U23 World Rowing Championships in Varese. She stroked that crew of Genevieve Hart, Jacqueline Swick and Eliza Gaffney to a bronze medal.   

At the 2022 World Rowing Championships at Racize, she was back in the Australian women's senior eight. They made the A final and finished in fifth place.

References

External links
Barr at World Rowing

2001 births
Living people
Australian female rowers
21st-century Australian women